Local elections were held for South Ribble Borough Council on 2 May 2019, the same day as other 2019 United Kingdom local elections. It resulted in the council going into no overall control (was previously Conservative controlled) with Labour taking charge after an agreement with the Liberal Democrats.

Results summary

The results of the 2019 elections are summarised below.

Ward results

Bamber Bridge East

Bamber Bridge West

Broadfield

Broad Oak

Buckshaw & Worden

Charnock

Coupe Green & Gregson Lane

Earnshaw Bridge

Farington East

Farington West (delayed)

Hoole

Howick & Priory

Leyland Central

Longton & Hutton West

Lostock Hall

Middleforth

Moss Side

New Longton & Hutton East

Samlesbury & Walton

Seven Stars

St. Ambrose

Walton-le-Dale East

Walton-le-Dale West

By-elections

Bamber Bridge East

References

2019 English local elections
South Ribble Borough Council elections